Triumph or Agony is the seventh album studio released by  Rhapsody of Fire in Europe on 25 September 2006.
It is the first album that the band released after their name change.

Triumph or Agony features a live 70 piece orchestra and choir and was again self-produced by guitarist/songwriter Luca Turilli and keyboardist/songwriter Alex Staropoli with assistance from co-producer Sascha Paeth. The album also features an array of guest narrators and character actors, including several recruits from the London theatre scene, the late Susannah York of the Superman film series and a return appearance by renowned actor Christopher Lee, as the all-knowing ‘Wizard King’. The song "Il Canto del Vento", is the first song in the band's history that is not composed by Turilli or Staropoli, instead it was composed by Fabio Lione.

The cover art is done by artist Jeff Easley, famous for his work on the Dungeons & Dragons line of products.

Track listing

Concept
"The Myth of the Holy Sword" presents the history of the Emerald Sword in the Emerald Sword Saga. During the third Elvish war in the battle for Galfor's mines, the warrior Naimur was captured by Atlon (referred to as "Hell's Fury"). Atlon tortured Naimur using an emerald stone to drain his energy and eventually killed him. After the battle, Loinir, Naimur's brother, took the stone used to torture Naimur and forged the Emerald Sword. Loinir asked the angels to bless the sword, filling it with their holy might.

Some years later, the Elves launched a new attack against Atlon and his forces, giving Loinir the chance to avenge his brother. "just a strike of the sword, [was] hell's last breath". Loinir felt as though the blade was too powerful, and thus he gave it to the wizards to examine. The wizards determined that the sword had indeed been enchanted with holy powers and that it could be dangerous if it fell into the wrong hands. They therefore hid the sword beyond the Ivory Gates.

Personnel 

Rhapsody of Fire
 Fabio Lione – lead vocals
 Luca Turilli – guitars, production
 Alex Staropoli – keyboards, orchestral arrangements, production
 Patrice Guers – bass
 Alex Holzwarth – drums

Additional personnel
 Manuel Staropoli – flute, recorder
 Christopher Lee – narration
 Toby Eddington – narration
 Stash Kirkbride – narration
 Christina Lee – narration
 Marcus D'Amico – narration
 Simon Fielding – narration
 Susannah York – narration
 Dominique Leurquin – guitar solos (2, 5, 7, 8)
 Johannes Monno – guitars (classical)
 Bridget Fogle – soprano vocals

Choir
 Cinzia Rizzo, Miro Rodenberg, Olaf Hayer, Previn Moore, Robert Hunecke-Rizzo, Thomas Rettke

Brno Academy Choir
 Dana Kurečková, Iva Holubová, Jana Klinerová, Jaroslava Zezulová, Kateřina Hudcová, Lucie Matalová, Ludmila Kieseljovová, Ludmila Markesová, Vladimíra Dolejšová, Jiří Klecker, Karel Seffer, Libor Markes, Michael Pinsker, Milan Hanzliczek, Pavel Konárek, Robert Kurečka, Serhij Derda, Tomáš Ibrmajer, Vladimír Kutnohorský, Alena Sobolová, Andrea Dáňová, Barbora Francová, Dana Toncrová, Eva Badalová, Eva Klepalová, Kateřina Nejedlá, Kateřina Pastrňáková, Magda Krejčová, Marie Vališová, Petra Bodová, Petra Koňárková, Terezie Kamenická, Terezie Plevová, Zora Jaborníková, Ivan Nepivoda, Jakub Herzan, Jiří Barták, Marek Mikuš, Matěj Dupal, Tomáš Kamenický, Vladimír Prachař, Vít Matuška

Bohuslav Martinů Philharmonic Orchestra

 Emil Nosek – violin
 František Hrubý – violin
 Hana Roušarová – violin
 Hana Tesařová – violin
 Jan Nedoma – violin
 Jana Štípková – violin
 Jitka Hanáková – violin
 Milan Lapka – violin
 Miroslav Křivánek – violin
 Přemysl Roušar – violin
 Dana Blahutová – violin
 Hana Bílková – violin
 Jan Kotulan – violin
 Jaroslav Aladzas – violin
 Jitka Šuranská – violin
 Josef Geryk – violin
 Josef Kubelka – violin
 Josef Vyžrálek – violin
 Leo Sláma – violin
 Yvona Fialová – violin
 Dana Božková – viola
 Juraj Petrovič – viola
 Lucie Dümlerová – viola

 Michaela Slámová – viola
 Miroslav Kašný – viola
 Oldřich Šebestík – viola
 Pavel Novák – viola
 Roman Janů – viola
 Alexandr Erml – celli
 David Kefer – celli
 Erich Hulín – celli
 Hana Škarpová – celli
 Zdenka Aladzasová – celli
 Zuzana Ermlová – celli
 Josef Horák – double bass
 Michal Pášma – double bass
 Pavel Juřík – double bass
 Vladimír Hudeček – double bass
 Vítězslav Pelikán – double bass
 Jana Holásková – flute
 Jiřina Vodičková – flute
 Vladimír Vodička – flute
 Krista Hallová – oboe
 Svatopluk Holásek – oboe
 Aleš Pavlorek – clarinet
 Jiří Kundl – clarinet

 Jaroslav Janoštík – bassoon
 Václav Kaniok – bassoon
 František Vyskočil – French horn
 Jiří Zatloukal – French horn
 Josef Číhal – French horn
 Milan Kubát – French horn
 Rudolf Linner – French horn
 Vlastimil Kelar – French horn
 Pavel Skopal – trumpet
 Rostislav Killar – trumpet
 Zdeněk Macek – trumpet
 Ivan Dřínovský – trombone
 Milan Tesař – trombone
 Roman Sklenář – trombone
 Miloslav Žváček – tuba
 Lucie Vápová – harp

Production

 Jeff Easley – cover art
 Petr Pololanik – orchestra conductor
 Marek Obdržálek – choir conductor
 Sascha Paeth – production, engineering, mixing
 Joey DeMaio – executive producer
 Rob LaVaque – editing, engineering

 Phillip Colodetti – editing, engineering
 Bernd Kugler – orchestra and choir recording
 Marc Lenz – orchestra and choir recording
 Jan Wrede – orchestra and choir recording
 Stefan Schmidt – orchestra and choir recording
 Olaf Reitmeier – engineering

Charts

References

External links
 Triumph or Agony Album Review

2006 albums
Rhapsody of Fire albums